The 55th annual Venice International Film Festival was held between 3 and 13 September 1998. The Golden Lion was awarded to Così ridevano by Gianni Amelio.

Jury
The following people comprised the 1998 jury:
 Ettore Scola (Italy) (head of jury)
 Hector Babenco (Argentina)
 Sharunas Bartas (Lithuania)
 Kathryn Bigelow (USA)
 Reinhard Hauff (Germany)
 Danièle Heymann (France)
 Ismail Merchant (India)
 Luis Sepúlveda (Chile)
 Tilda Swinton (UK)
 Georges Benayoun (Morocco) (short films) (head of jury)
 Chiara Caselli (Italy) (short films)
 Abel Ferrara (USA) (short films)

Official selection

In competition

Autonomous sections

Venice International Film Critics' Week
The following feature films were selected to be screened as In Competition for this section:
 Beat by Amon Miyamoto (Japan)
 Ghodoua Nahrek (fr. Demain, je brûle..., en. Tomorrow I Burn) by Mohamed Ben Smàil (Tunisia)
 La mère  (en. Mother Christian) by Myriam Boyer (France)
 The Scent of the Night (L'odore della notte) by Claudio Caligari (Italy)
 Orphans by Peter Mullan (United Kingdom)
 The Opposite of Sex by Don Roos (United States)
 The Iron Heel of Oligarchy (Zheleznaya pyata oligarkhii) by Aleksandr Bashirov (Russia)

Awards
 Golden Lion:
 Così ridevano (Gianni Amelio)
Grand Special Jury Prize:
Terminus Paradis (Lucian Pintilie)
Silver Lion:
Crna macka, beli macor (Emir Kusturica)
Golden Osella:
Best Screenplay: (Eric Rohmer) Conte d'automne
Best Cinematography: (Luca Bigazzi) Così ridevano
Best Score: (Gerardo Gandini) La Nube
Volpi Cup:
Best Actor: Sean Penn Hurlyburly
Best Actress: Catherine Deneuve Place Vendôme
The President of the Italian Senate's Gold Medal:
The Silence (Mohsen Makhmalbaf)
Marcello Mastroianni Award:
L'albero delle pere (Niccolò Senni)
Career Golden Lion:
Sophia Loren
Andrzej Wajda
Warren Beatty
FIPRESCI Prize:
Best First Feature: Train of Life (Radu Mihăileanu)
Best Feature: Cabaret Balkan (Goran Paskaljević)
OCIC Award:
L'albero delle pere (Francesca Archibugi)
UNICEF Award:
L'albero delle pere (Francesca Archibugi)
UNESCO Award:
Colonel Bunker (Kujtim Çashku)
Special Mention: La Nube (Fernando Solanas)
Pasinetti Award:
Best Actor: The Garden of Eden (Kim Rossi Stuart)
Best Actress: Del perduto amore (Giovanna Mezzogiorno)
Pietro Bianchi Award:
Michelangelo Antonioni
Isvema Award:
Orphans (Peter Mullan)
FEDIC Award:
Del perduto amore (Michele Placido)
Special Mention: Ospiti (Matteo Garrone)
Special Mention: Sto lavorando? (Daniele Segre)
Little Golden Lion:
Crna macka, beli macor (Emir Kusturica)
Anicaflash Prize:
Train of Life (Radu Mihăileanu)
Elvira Notari Prize:
Trap, Trap, Little Trap (Věra Chytilová)
Special Mention: New Rose Hotel (Abel Ferrara)
Cult Network Italia Prize:
Orphans (Peter Mullan)
FilmCritica "Bastone Bianco" Award:
New Rose Hotel (Abel Ferrara)
Laterna Magica Prize:
Crna macka, beli macor (Emir Kusturica)
Sergio Trasatti Award:
The Garden of Eden (Alessandro D'Alatri)
Special Mention: Autumn Tale (Éric Rohmer)
Special Mention: Così ridevano (Gianni Amelio)
Special Mention: The Silence (Mohsen Makhmalbaf)
CinemAvvenire Award:
Best Film on the Relationship Man-Nature: The Silence (Mohsen Makhmalbaf)
Best Film: La Nube (Fernando Solanas)
Best First Film: Vivre au paradis (Bourlem Guerdjou)
Kodak Award:
Orphans (Peter Mullan)
IN-COMPETITION: Ospiti (Matteo Garrone)
Prix Pierrot:
Orphans (Peter Mullan)
Max Factor Award:
Elizabeth (Jenny Shircore)

References

External links 

Venice Film Festival 1998 Awards on IMDb

Venice
V
Venice Film Festival
Film
Venice
September 1998 events in Europe